This is a list of flag bearers who have represented Uruguay at the Olympics.

Flag bearers carry the national flag of their country at the opening ceremony of the Olympic Games.

See also
Uruguay at the Olympics

References

Uruguay at the Olympics
Uruguay
Olympics